The following highways are numbered 204:

Canada
 Manitoba Provincial Road 204
 Newfoundland and Labrador Route 204
 Nova Scotia Route 204
 Prince Edward Island Route 204
 Quebec Route 204

China
 China National Highway 204

Costa Rica
 National Route 204

Japan
 Japan National Route 204

United States
 Alabama State Route 204
 Arkansas Highway 204 (former)
 California State Route 204
 Florida State Road 204 (former)
 Georgia State Route 204
 Iowa Highway 204 (former)
 K-204 (Kansas highway)
 Maine State Route 204
 Massachusetts Route 204 (former)
 M-204 (Michigan highway)
 Montana Secondary Highway 204
 New Mexico State Road 204
 New York State Route 204
 Ohio State Route 204
 Oregon Route 204
 Pennsylvania Route 204
 South Dakota Highway 204
 Tennessee State Route 204
 Texas State Highway 204
 Texas State Highway Loop 204
 Utah State Route 204
 Virginia State Route 204
 Washington State Route 204
Territories
 Puerto Rico Highway 204